The Anything Goes Tour was the second headlining concert tour from American country music duo the Florida Georgia Line, in support of their studio album Anything Goes. It began on January 15, 2015, in Toledo, Ohio. Thomas Rhett and Frankie Ballard served as opening act. For Pollstar's Year End Top 200 North American Tours of 2015, it ranked thirty-first and grossed $29.5 million.

Background
On October 8, 2014, the duo appeared on the Today Show to announce the tour. 
 Additional dates were announced in January 2015. 

Their February 25, 2015, sold-out show at Madison Square Garden led Brian Kelley to thank fans, "We've waited a long time for this", "I've gotta give you guys props. You guys sold out Madison Square Garden on a Wednesday night."

Concert synopsis
The show began with the duo shooting straight up in the air from apparatuses at each ends of the stage, which had a sci-fi design.
 
Hubbard and Kelley kicked off the show with "Every Night" and "Smile", two non-singles from their current album, and ended the night with their smash hit "Cruise". During the show they went into an acoustic setup for "Dirt". Tyler Hubbard has said he thinks about his father in heaven when they sing that song, so towards the end of it, during the New York City show he called out, "From MSG to Heaven." Opening acts Thomas Rhett and Frankie joined Florida Georgia Line for "Party People". They sang medley of covers which included songs such as Meghan Trainor's "All About That Bass" and Garth Brooks's "Friends in Low Places".

Opening acts
Thomas Rhett
Frankie Ballard

Setlist

"Every Night"
"Smile"
"It'z Just What We Do"
"Round Here"
"Anything Goes"
"Get Your Shine On"
"Bumpin' the Night"
"Sippin' On Fire"
"Dayum Baby"
"Dirt"
"Like You Ain't Even Gone
"Stay" 
"This Is How We Roll"
"Sun Daze"
"Party People" 
Covers medley: "All About That Bass"/"Forgot About Dre"/"We Dem Boyz"/"Treasure"/"Friends in Low Places" 
"Cruise"
Encore

18. "Good Good"

19. "Smoke"

Tour dates

Festivals
 This concert is a part of Summerfest.

Critical reception
Jim Allen of CMT.com said about their sold-out show at Madison Square Garden, "Instead of hitting the crowd over the head with the hits from the start, they kicked off with a pair of nonsingles from their 2014 No. 1 album, Anything Goes — "Every Night" and "Smile". By the second song, Kelley had stripped down to a muscle shirt, giving a spotlight to both his gym-rat physique and his tattoos. This move garnered no audible dissent from the strikingly high percentage of giddy young girls in the audience."

References

2015 concert tours
Florida Georgia Line concert tours